Deramas tomokoae is a butterfly of the family Lycaenidae. It is found on Mindanao in the Philippines.

References

 , 1978: New Species of Narathura and Deramas from Mindanao(Lepidoptera: Lycaenidae). Tyô to Ga. 3 (3): 171–174.
, 1995. Checklist of the butterflies of the Philippine Islands (Lepidoptera: Rhopalocera) Nachrichten des Entomologischen Vereins Apollo Suppl. 14: 7–118.

 , 2012: Revised checklist of the butterflies of the Philippine Islands (Lepidoptera: Rhopalocera). Nachrichten des Entomologischen Vereins Apollo, Suppl. 20: 1-64.

Butterflies described in 1978
Deramas